Dhiyadhoo (Dhivehi: ދިޔަދޫ) is one of the Uninhabited islands of Gaafu Alif Atoll.

Islands of the Maldives